Mohammed Ouseb (born July 17, 1974 in Tsumeb) is a Namibian footballer.  He previously played for South Africa's Premier Soccer League clubs Kaizer Chiefs, Moroka Swallows and Norway's FC Lyn Oslo as well as Chief Santos in his home country. He played for the Namibia national football team at the 1998 African Cup of Nations.

References

External links

1974 births
Living people
People from Tsumeb
Lyn Fotball players
Kaizer Chiefs F.C. players
Moroka Swallows F.C. players
Association football defenders
Namibian men's footballers
Namibia international footballers
1998 African Cup of Nations players
Expatriate footballers in Norway
Namibian expatriate sportspeople in Norway
Expatriate soccer players in South Africa
Namibian expatriate sportspeople in South Africa
Namibian expatriate footballers
Eliteserien players
South African Premier Division players
Orlando Pirates S.C. players
Chief Santos players